Pei-yuan Chia (born 1939) is an American banker. He worked for Citicorp from 1974 until his retirement in 1996, and also held directorships in several other firms.

Career
Chia worked at General Foods before joining Citicorp in 1974. From then until 1992, he held various senior management positions in Citicorp and Citibank, N.A. and was Citibank, N.A.'s senior customer contact for corporate banking activities in Asia. He was promoted to head of the global consumer business in 1992, following a four-year period in which he grew Citicorp's foreign consumer banking operations by 25% annually to $300 million per year in profit. He served as a director of Citicorp and Citibank, N.A., beginning in April 1993, and became vice chairman of Citicorp and Citibank, N.A., in January 1994. He took early retirement in 1996 at the urging of then-CEO John S. Reed. At the time of his retirement, he was the highest-ranking Asian American executive and corporate director in any major U.S. corporation.

Personal life

Chia was born in Hong Kong.  His father Dewey Teh-huai Chia (1912–1998), the second son of Republic of China Ministry of Finance official , was prominent in Shanghai's finance industry. His mother Kitty Shun-hua Chin Chia (1916–2016), a daughter of educationalist , was a graduate of Yenching University. Chia's parents had moved to Hong Kong the year before his birth, and then the family moved again to Taiwan in 1951. His parents eventually settled in the United States in 1956, where his father started a maritime transport company and his mother worked as a statistician in the United Nations Secretariat. Chia himself remained in Taiwan for his education, attending Jianguo Middle School in Taipei and going on to graduate from Tunghai University in Taichung with a Bachelor of Arts degree in Economics in 1961. He then joined his family in the U.S., where he earned an MBA from the Wharton School of the University of Pennsylvania in 1964. He was naturalized as a U.S. citizen in 1970.

Chia was married to Frances T.C. Yen Chia, a classmate of his at Tunghai University and a daughter of former President of the Republic of China Yen Chia-kan, from 1965 until her death in 2003. He had three children with her: Douglas, a lawyer; Katherine, an architect; and Candice.  He remarried in 2005 to his high school sweetheart Katherine "Kitty" Shen.

To commemorate Frances' life, Chia endowed a garden in front of the women's dormitory at Tunghai University, which opened in November 2006. He also established an endowed professorship in marketing, the Frances and Pei-Yuan Chia Professorship, at the University of Pennsylvania; it has been held by Peter Fader since 2003. He was awarded an honorary doctorate by Tunghai University in 2007.

Other activities
Chia served on the Wharton Graduate Executive Board of the University of Pennsylvania. In addition, he is a Senior Fellow of the SEI Center for Advanced Studies in Management at the Wharton Business School. As chairman of the Chia Family Foundation, he conducts philanthropic activities benefiting various educational and medical causes, including the Hoag Hospital Foundation. In June 2022, Hoag named a hospital building in Irvine, California, for Chia and his wife Shen in recognition of their philanthropy.

Chia also serves or previously served as:

 Director of American International Group (until 2006)
 Trustee of the Asia Society
 Trustee of the Mt. Sinai-NYU Medical Centre
 Director of Aig Aviation
 Director of BOC Hong Kong Holdings Ltd. and its principal operating subsidiary Bank of China (Hong Kong) Ltd. (2001–2003)
 Director of Baxter International Inc.
 Director of Case Corporation (since 1997)
 Director of CNH Global Inc.
 Director of Singapore Airlines Ltd. (since 2003)
 Senior advisor to Temasek Holdings

References

External links
Photo with Victor Menezes at the Museum of Chinese in America
Photo with his second wife Kitty Shen at the Museum of Chinese in America

1939 births
Living people
American bankers
American businesspeople in insurance
American people of Chinese descent
American International Group people
Bank of China people
Citigroup people
Temasek Holdings people
Tunghai University alumni
Wharton School of the University of Pennsylvania alumni